Navibulgar is a Bulgarian shipping company, the largest in the country, with a fleet of 70 vessels: 46 bulk carriers, 9 container vessels, 5 tanker and chemical vessels, and 10 combined tonnage vessels, including their new 30,700-tonne ship, which became a part of their fleet in June 2012.

Acquisitions
In 2002, the company acquired Varna shipyard for $16.1 million.

In May 2014, Navibulgar completed its set of modern domestically built handymax ships with a deal for a Greek-owned bulker. The vessel is named Wanderlust and was originally ordered for design and building in 1997.

References

External links
 Official site

Shipping companies of Bulgaria
Transport companies established in 1892
Economy of Varna, Bulgaria
Transport in Varna, Bulgaria
1892 establishments in Bulgaria